Bassidiki Touré (7 December 1939 – 28 April 2001), commonly known as Bako Touré, was a Mali international football forward who played for clubs in Mali and France.

Playing career
Born in Bamako, Touré began playing club football for local sides ASPTT Bamako and Jeanne d'Arc de Bamako.

In 1957, Touré moved to France and joined ASPTT Nice. He would soon play for Ligue 1 sides Olympique de Marseille, Toulouse FC and AS Nancy.

After a spell playing in Ligue 2, he joined FC Nantes and would win Ligue 1 during 1965.

Touré made several appearances for the senior Mali national football team and participated in the 1972 African Cup of Nations finals, where Mali placed second.

Personal
Touré is the father of French international and Olympic footballer José Touré. Touré died at age 61 on 28 April 2001.

References

External links

Bassidiki TOURE at OM1899.com 

1939 births
2001 deaths
Sportspeople from Bamako
Association football forwards
Malian footballers
Malian expatriate footballers
Mali international footballers
1972 African Cup of Nations players
Olympique de Marseille players
Toulouse FC players
AS Nancy Lorraine players
SC Toulon players
Limoges FC players
FC Nantes players
AC Ajaccio players
Blois Football 41 players
Ligue 1 players
Ligue 2 players
Expatriate footballers in France
Malian expatriate sportspeople in France